The 2014 Esiliiga was the 24th season of the Esiliiga. The season started on Sunday 2 March 2014, and concluded on Sunday 9 November 2014. Flora II Tallinn won the Esiliiga, finishing with 78 points.

Teams
A total of 10 teams contested the league, including 7 teams from the 2013 season. The 2013 runners-up Lokomotiv Jõhvi were promoted to Meistriliiga, while 9th place Puuma Tallinn and 10th place Irbis Kiviõli escaped relegation due to dissolving of 5th place Tartu SK 10 and 6th place Tammeka II Tartu. For this season those three teams will be replaced by the Meistriliiga relegated Kuressaare and Esiliiga B promoted Nõmme Kalju II and Pärnu Linnameeskond. The previous runners-up Tarvas Rakvere failed to win a promotion, losing the promotion play-off, while 8th placed Tulevik Viljandi managed to avoid relegation by winning the relegation play-off.

Stadiums and locations

Personnel and kits
Note: Flags indicate national team as has been defined under FIFA eligibility rules. Players and Managers may hold more than one non-FIFA nationality.

Managerial changes

League table

Promotion play-offs
Tulevik Viljandi, who finished 5th, faced Lokomotiv Jõhvi, the 9th-placed 2014 Meistriliiga side for a two-legged play-off. The winner on aggregate score after both matches will earn a spot in the 2015 Meistriliiga. Tulevik Viljandi won 1–1 on aggregate.

Relegation play-offs
Tarvas Rakvere remained in Esiliiga after HÜJK Emmaste voluntarily declined joining the league.

Season statistics

Top scorers

Awards

Monthly awards

See also

 2013–14 Estonian Cup
 2014–15 Estonian Cup
 2014 Meistriliiga
 2014 Esiliiga B

References

Esiliiga seasons
2
Estonia
Estonia